Eric Gray may refer to:

Eric Gray (American football) (born 1999), American football player
Eric Gray (photographer), British photographer